Willie James Germany Jr.  (born May 9, 1948) is a former American football defensive back who played four years in the National Football League.

Background
Germany was born in Columbus, Georgia, he went to Howard High School (Ellicott City, Maryland) and he attended college at Morgan State University in Baltimore, Maryland.

Career
Drafted by the Washington Redskins in the seventh round (166th overall) of the 1971 NFL Draft, Germany played in 42 games during his four-year NFL career. A journeyman defensive back, Germany played for the Atlanta Falcons, the Detroit Lions, the Houston Oilers and the New England Patriots.

References

1948 births
Living people
American football defensive backs
Detroit Lions players
Atlanta Falcons players
Morgan State Bears football players
New England Patriots players